Downtown West–Kerby station is a CTrain station in Calgary, Alberta, Canada. It is located in the free-fare zone on the 7 Avenue transit-only corridor. A public preview occurred on December 8, 2012, and the station opened for revenue service on December 10, 2012.

This station replaces the former centre-loading  platform and relocated one block to the west. Initially, the name of this new dual side-loading platform was to be just 11 Street SW. However, Calgary City Hall changed the name to its present form because of the history of the Kerby family name in this location and the proximity to the Kerby Centre (a major social services centre primarily for seniors). The only other two-platform station in downtown is the  station at the eastern end of the 7 Avenue SW transit mall. As part of the Calgary Transit Seventh Avenue refurbishment project Downtown West-Kerby has been built to accommodate 4-car consists.

This station serves mainly the Downtown West End community, both residential and businesses.

Notable places nearby
Mewata Armoury
Shaw Millennium skatepark
The Kerby Centre
The Chinese Consulate-General office at 6 Avenue SW (1 block north) and between 9 Street SW and 10 Street SW
Athabasca University (Calgary Campus)

References

CTrain stations
Railway stations in Canada opened in 2012
2012 establishments in Alberta